The Transnet Freight Rail Class 23E of 2017 is a South African electric locomotive.

Manufacturers

The TRAXX Africa F100 MS TFR Class 23E Locomotive is a Co-Co, electrical, multi system freight locomotive designed to operate under 3 kV DC and 25 kV AC catenary voltages on  track.

The acquisition of the Class 23E forms part of the largest-ever locomotive supply contract in South African history and the single-biggest investment initiative by a South African corporation. It consists of contracts for the construction of 1,064 locomotives by four global original equipment manufacturers:
 CSR Zhuzhou Electric Locomotive Company, for 359 Class 22E dual-voltage electric locomotives.
 Bombardier Transportation South Africa, for 240 Class 23E dual-voltage electric locomotives.
 General Electric South Africa Technologies (a unit of the U.S.-based GE Transportation), for 233 Class 44-000 diesel-electric locomotives.
 CNR Rolling Stock South Africa (Pty.) Ltd., for 232 Class 45-000 diesel-electric locomotives.

References

3240
Co-Co locomotives
Cape gauge railway locomotives
Multi-system locomotives
Railway locomotives introduced in 2015
2015 in South Africa